The rosyside dace (Clinostomus funduloides) is a species of cyprinid fish.

This fish is about 11 centimeters long. The lower parts of its sides are red, giving rise to its name, and the upper parts of its sides are dark green.

The rosyside dace is native to parts of the southeastern and eastern United States, including the Delaware River drainage, the Savannah River drainage, and the Ohio River basin. It is thought to have been introduced in western Virginia.

References

External links
FishBase: "Clinostoma funduloides Girard, 1856"

Clinostomus
Taxa named by Charles Frédéric Girard
Fish described in 1856